Blue Montana Skies is a 1939 American Western film directed by B. Reeves Eason and starring Gene Autry, Smiley Burnette, and June Storey. Based on a story by Norman S. Hall and Paul Franklin, the film is about a singing cowboy who goes up against a gang of fur smugglers operating near the Canada–United States border.

Plot
While driving a herd of cattle in northern Montana, cowboys Gene Autry (Gene Autry), Frog Millhouse (Smiley Burnette), and Steve (Tully Marshall) cross the border into Canada. Riding alone, Steve stumbles upon a convoy of fur smugglers who stab him and leave him to die in the woods. Before dying, he manages to scrawl the initials "HH".

After discovering the body of their murdered friend and his final cryptic clue, Gene and Frog ride to the nearby HH ranch, which is owned by Dorothy Hamilton (June Storey) and her partner, Hendricks (Harry Woods). Unknown to Dorothy, Hendricks is the head of the fur smuggling ring. Suspicious of Hendricks, Gene and Frog stampede their cattle into the HH herd as an excuse to spend time at the ranch and investigate. Soon they discover that the furs are being smuggled into a storehouse on the ranch and then shipped out of the country. While preparing to escort another shipment of pelts, the smugglers discover Gene and Frog in the storeroom and, deciding to use Gene as a cover for their illegal activities, hijack him and his wagon.

After the smugglers leave, Frog escapes from the storeroom and organizes a rescue party to search for Gene and his captors. As the smugglers hold up another warehouse of furs, Gene escapes and tries to prevent the robbery, but is shot in the arm. He manages to sound the alarm and then follows after the smugglers by dogsled. After catching up to the thieves, Gene sees them loading the furs into Hendricks' car. Gene causes a daring avalanche that traps the smugglers and exacts justice for the murder of his friend.

Cast
 Gene Autry as Gene Autry
 Smiley Burnette as Frog Millhouse
 June Storey as Dorothy Hamilton 
 Harry Woods as Hendricks 
 Tully Marshall as Steve 
 Al Bridge as Marshal 
 Glenn Strange as Henchman Bob Causer 
 Dorothy Granger as Mrs. Millie Potter 
 Edmund Cobb as Eddie Brennan 
 Robert Winkler as Wilbur Potter, the Boy 
 Jack Ingram as Henchman Frazier 
 Augie Gomez as Blackfeather 
 John Beach as N.W. Mountie Corporal 
 Walt Shrum and His Colorado Hillbillies as Musicians at Dance
 Champion as Gene's Horse (uncredited)

Production

Filming locations
 Big Bear Lake, Big Bear Valley, San Bernardino National Forest, California, USA
 Lake Sherwood, Agoura Ranch
 Morrison Ranch

Soundtrack
 "Rockin' in the Saddle" (Gene Autry, Johnny Marvin, Fred Rose) by Gene Autry, Smiley Burnette, and cowboys
 "'Neath the Blue Montana Skies" (Gene Autry, Johnny Marvin, Fred Rose) by Gene Autry and cowboys
 "The Old Geezer" (Gene Autry, Johnny Marvin, Fred Rose) by Gene Autry, Smiley Burnette, and Dorothy Granger (piano)
 "Famous Men of the West" by Gene Autry and Walt Shrum and His Colorado Hillbillies
 "I Just Want You" (Gene Autry, Johnny Marvin, Fred Rose) by Gene Autry and Walt Shrum and His Colorado Hillbillies

References
Citations

Bibliography

External links
 
 
 

1939 films
American Western (genre) films
1939 Western (genre) films
American black-and-white films
Republic Pictures films
Films set in Canada
Films directed by B. Reeves Eason
1930s English-language films
1930s American films